The Jungle Book: Alive with Magic was a short lived nighttime show at Disney's Animal Kingdom in the Walt Disney World Resort. The Jungle Book: Alive with Magic was located in the park's Discovery River. The show was limited-time engagement, filled the space of the delayed Rivers of Light night-time show, presumably until Rivers of Light was ready. The show featured music from the film, adding an Indian influence. The show opened on May 28, 2016, with a soft opening the night before.

References

External links

Walt Disney Parks and Resorts entertainment
Disney's Animal Kingdom
Asia (Disney's Animal Kingdom)
The Jungle Book (franchise)
Amusement park attractions based on film franchises